214 (two hundred [and] fourteen) is the natural number following 213 and preceding 215.

In mathematics
214 is a composite number (with prime factorization 2 * 107) and a triacontakaiheptagonal number (37-gonal number).
214!! − 1 is a 205-digit prime number.
The 11th perfect number 2106×(2107−1) has 214 divisors.
Number of regions into which a figure made up of a row of 5 adjacent congruent rectangles is divided upon drawing diagonals of all possible rectangles.

In other fields
214 is a song by Rivermaya.
214 Aschera is a Main belt asteroid.
E214 is the E number of Ethylparaben.
The Bell 214 is a helicopter.
The Tupolev 214 is an airliner.
Type 214 submarine
There are several highways numbered 214.
Form DD 214 documents discharge from the U.S. Armed Forces.
The number of Wainwright-listed summits of the English Lake District

214 is also:

The first area code of metropolitan Dallas, Texas
The number of Chinese radicals for the writing of Chinese characters according to the 1716 Kangxi Dictionary.
SMTP status code for a reply message to a help command
The Dewey Decimal Classification for Theodicy (the problem of evil).

References

 Wells, D. (1987). The Penguin Dictionary of Curious and Interesting Numbers (p. 143). London: Penguin Group.

Integers